Qarqasin (also Romanized as Qarqasīn) is a village in Ak Rural District, Esfarvarin District, Takestan County, Qazvin Province, Iran. At the 2006 census, its population was 1,208, in 228 families.

References 

Populated places in Takestan County